Mazaný Filip is a Czech comedy film released in 2003 and based on a stage play by Sklep Theatre.

Cast and characters
Philip Marlowe .... Tomáš Hanák
Velma Hatfield .... Vilma Cibulková
Paolo Perrugini .... Oldřich Kaiser
Jules Amthor .... Ivo Kubečka
Barman at the Egypt Club .... Viktor Preiss
Reception Clerk in Central .... Bohumil "Bob" Klepl
Tornado You .... Eva Holubová (sings by Tereza Dufková)
Benjamin Frogg, director .... Milan Šteindler
Guest in Hotel .... Jakub Špalek
Officer Kid .... Jan Slovák
Kenny Mattel .... Petr Vacek
Taxi Driver .... Lenka Vychodilová
Old Man in the Lift .... Ivan Vyskočil
Entertainer .... Tomáš Vorel
Film Director .... Jaroslav Dušek
A Friend in Studio .... Matěj Hádek
Chandler .... Šimon Caban
L.A. Mayor .... Miroslav Etzler
Film Sharpener .... Martin Duba
Make Up Artist .... Ivan Trojan
Bedouin .... Otakáro Schmidt
Drunkard ....Zdeněk David
Lieutenant McGee .... Jiří Fero Burda
Gangster Jussepe .... Petr Čtvrtníček
Charlie Brown / Nigel Smith .... Pavel Liška
Magician .... Aleš Najbrt
De Soto .... Jiří Macháček
McChesney .... Robert Nebřenský
Cinematographer .... Martin Zbrožek
Gogo .... Radomil Uhlíř
Film Clappet .... Barbara Trojanová
Ben Goodman .... František Skála
Barman Lopez .... Michal Novotný
Maid .... Ruth Horáčková
Gangster Adolfo .... Miroslav Táborský
Matěj Forman, Petr Forman, Tereza Kučerová, Václav Marhoul, Štefan Uhrík, Vlastimil Zavřel, Jan Kraus, Čestmír Suška, Standa Diviš, Monika Načeva, Aleš Týbl, Jiří David, Libor Balabán, Zdeněk Lhotský, Petr Nikl, Anna Geislerová

Theatre

Šlapanice Theatre 
Directed by Hana Krčmová. The premiere had 14 March 2008 in Sokol House in Šlapanice.
Phil Marlowe .... Tomáš Thomas Příkrý
Paul Vannier .... Marek Gumeny šudoma
Vivien Harfield .... Klára Bednářová
Receptionist Clerk .... Veronika Přikrylová
Kuvalick .... Mirek Hrozek
Barman at the Egypt Club .... Marek Charvát
Barflies .... Milan Pernica and Jiří Přichystal
Cinematographer .... Veronika Přikrylová
Friends .... Gabriela Zmeškalová or Eva Benešová
Electrician .... Tereza Urbanová
Comparsist .... Jakub Hýbela or Pavel Svoboda
Director .... Barbora Krčmová
Producer .... Marek Šudoma
Film Clappet .... Tereza Hašková
Jules Amthor .... Jakub Juráň or Miloš Borovička
Barman in Mexico Bar .... Mirek Hrozek
McChesney .... Roman Koplík
Hubert, gay in bar .... Jakub Hýbela or Pavel Svoboda
Mafioso Adolfo .... Miloš Borovička / Jakub Juráň
Mafioso Jussepe .... Aleš Vodička
Mafioso De Soto .... Jiří Klimeš
Mafioso Gogo .... Marek Charvát
Boss Perrugini .... Petr Jahoš
School girl .... Tereza Hašková
Sergeant .... Petr Holík
Stážník .... Jakub Hýbela / Pavel Svoboda
Cop Fialka .... Mirek Hrozek
Doctor Frank Ruman .... Jiří Klimeš
Servant ot Hospital .... Petr Holík / Jakub Hýbela / PAvel Svoboda
Joe Bacci .... Marek Šudoma
Cold Cook .... Petr Holík / Jakub Juráň / Miloš Borovička

External links
 
 Šlapanice Theatre Website

2003 films
2003 comedy films
Film noir
Czech Lion Awards winners (films)
Czech comedy films
2000s Czech films
Czech parody films